KKUU (92.7 FM) is a commercial radio station in Indio, California, broadcasting to the Palm Springs, California, area. KKUU airs a Rhythmic Top 40 (CHR) music format branded as "U 92.7".

History
KKUU has aired five different programming formats since signing on in 1984. The station first signed on airing a Country format as KECY-FM, and was a sister station to KECY-TV. Later, KECY-FM changed call letters to KCMJ-FM and flipped to a Hot AC format as "KC92.7 FM". Later, the station shifted to soft AC as "Classy 92", which would later shift to All-80s Hits under the affiliation of CBS Radio. For a brief time in the 1990s, the station was branded as "Sunny 92.7". KCMJ-FM aired a classic hits format branded as "Arrow 92.7" prior to flipping to the current rhythmic format as KKUU in May 1998.  KKUU has played hits outside the rhythmic contemporary structure, such as Not Over You by Gavin DeGraw, but is a Mediabase rhythmic contemporary reporter while it also reports to the Nielsen BDS rhythmic contemporary indicator panel.

Former personalities include Jimmy Kimmel, Kevin Koske, and Mike Bell. It is a radio affiliate for the Los Angeles Rams.

KKUU HD2
Broadcast on translator 103.9 K2308V in 2012 It signed on with a Hot AC format branded as Crush 103.9 but in 2015 the station shifted to Soft AC and identified itself as 103.9 FM and then rebranded as Easy 103.9. Then it would later rebrand as 103.9 The Breeze The Perfect Blend. In November 2015 the station flipped to its current sports format with programing being feed by ESPN Radio

Competition
KKUU gets little competition in the Palm Springs area (Coachella Valley).  There are 3 stations that give competition to KKUU: KPSI-FM Mix 100.5 (which is a sister station), KPST-FM Fuego FM 103.5, and KJJZ Hot 95.9. KKUU also competed against KRCK until that station's flip in 2021.

Previous logo

External links
U-92.7 official website

KUU
Rhythmic contemporary radio stations in the United States
Radio stations established in 1985
Alpha Media radio stations
1985 establishments in California